St. Paul's Memorial Episcopal Church and Guild Hall is a historic church at 714–716 National Avenue in Las Vegas, New Mexico. Construction took place from 1886 to 1888, and it was added to the National Register of Historic Places in 1976.

Though the church structure was constructed in the late-1880s, it was not completed until 1950. The 1950 work, completing a sanctuary and chancel, was designed by architect John Gaw Meem. It is built of local red sandstone.

See also

National Register of Historic Places listings in San Miguel County, New Mexico

References

Churches completed in 1886
Churches in Las Vegas, New Mexico
Episcopal church buildings in New Mexico
Churches on the National Register of Historic Places in New Mexico
19th-century Episcopal church buildings
National Register of Historic Places in San Miguel County, New Mexico